Carboxypeptidase G may refer to:
 Glutamate carboxypeptidase, an enzyme
 Gamma-glutamyl hydrolase, an enzyme